Asen Peak is a peak in eastern Livingston Island in the South Shetland Islands, Antarctica.  The peak rises to 810 m in the Delchev Ridge of the Tangra Mountains.  The peak overlooks Iskar Glacier and Bruix Cove to the northwest, Ropotamo Glacier to the east-southeast and Dobrudzha Glacier to the south.  The peak was named after Tsar Ivan Asen I of Bulgaria, 1190-1196 AD.

Location

See also
 Bulgarian toponyms in Antarctica
 Antarctic Place-names Commission

Maps
 L.L. Ivanov et al. Antarctica: Livingston Island and Greenwich Island, South Shetland Islands. Scale 1:100000 topographic map. Sofia: Antarctic Place-names Commission of Bulgaria, 2005.
 L.L. Ivanov. Antarctica: Livingston Island and Greenwich, Robert, Snow and Smith Islands. Scale 1:120000 topographic map.  Troyan: Manfred Wörner Foundation, 2009.

References
 Asen Peak. SCAR Composite Gazetteer of Antarctica
 Bulgarian Antarctic Gazetteer. Antarctic Place-names Commission. (details in Bulgarian, basic data in English)

External links
 Asen Peak. Copernix satellite image

Tangra Mountains